The Abanga River is a river of Gabon.  It is one of the right tributaries of the Ogooué. It rises in the Cristal Mountains, near Medouneu. It is about 160 km long. It joins the Ogooué river near the town of Bifoun.

References
 Lerique Jacques. 1983. Hydrographie-Hydrologie. in Geographie et Cartographie du Gabon, Atlas Illustré led by The Ministère de l'Education Nationale de la Republique Gabonaise. Pg 14–15. Paris, France: Edicef.
 Perusset André. 1983. Oro-Hydrographie (Le Relief) in Geographie et Cartographie du Gabon, Atlas Illustré led by The Ministère de l'Education Nationale de la Republique Gabonaise. Pg 10–13. Paris, France: Edicef.

Rivers of Gabon